Coptis occidentalis, the Idaho goldthread, is plant native to western North America.  It is a member of the buttercup family.  This plant has also been known under the binomial Chrysocoptis occidentalis and the common name western goldthread.

The Idaho goldthread is a spring flowering plant, usually found in moist coniferous forests.

References

External links
  Pictures & information

occidentalis
Flora of Idaho
Flora without expected TNC conservation status